Lord Melchett may refer to:
Baron Melchett, a title in the Peerage of the United Kingdom, held by:
Alfred Mond, 1st Baron Melchett (1868–1930)
Henry Mond, 2nd Baron Melchett (1898–1949)
Julian Mond, 3rd Baron Melchett (1925–1973)
Peter Mond, 4th Baron Melchett (1948-2018)
A fictional character in the fourth series of the British sitcom, Blackadder, played by Stephen Fry. See List of Blackadder characters#Melchett